Shensiplusia was a genus of moths of the family Noctuidae. The species in the genus have been transferred to Chrysodeixis.

References
Natural History Museum Lepidoptera genus database
Chrysodeixis at funet, listing Shensiplusia as a synonym

Plusiinae